St. Madoes is a village in the Carse of Gowrie, Scotland. It was developed near Pitfour Castle. It is believed that there have been settlements since around 1000 C.E based on discoveries of several standing stones and the St. Madoes stone, a well-preserved Pictish cross.

Local amenities at St. Madoes include a small shop, two parks, a primary school and an 18th-century church built upon the remains of an earlier church. It is believed the original drawings for the church were done by the architect Robert Adam (1728-1792); the design and layout are very similar to the only other known Robert Adam country kirk (Kirkoswald near Culzean Castle) with the most noted similarity being the gallery (or Laird's Loft) on the back wall, facing the central pulpit. Adam also designed Pitfour Castle. Both buildings were funded by the laird John Richardson (1760-1821), a wealthy local man involved with the salmon fisheries of the Tay.

Recently the village has started expanding due to the building of a large housing estate.

It is located near Errol, between Dundee and Perth.

Notable residents
Alexander Lindsay of Evelick, bishop of Dunkeld 1607–1638
James Noble, minister of the parish 1828-1848, noted geologist
Alfred ("Alf") Smith (1908-2019), Scotland's oldest man, died aged 111

See also
 Frederick Millar, 1st Baron Inchyra

References

External links 

Villages in Perth and Kinross